The opinions delivered by the Supreme Court of Kenya since its inception are outlined below

2011

Election Date

Decision
The Supreme Court declined to issue directions on the date of the next General Election and referred the matter to the High Court.

Judges
The ruling was read by Chief Justice Willy Mutunga on behalf of the full bench consisting of:
 Chief Justice Martha Koome,
 Deputy Chief Justice - Justice Philomena Mwilu
 Justice William Ouko
 Justice Mohammed Ibrahim
 Justice Njoki Ndung'u
 Justice Smokin Wanjala
 Justice Isaac Lenaola

2012

Gender Representation

Decision
On 11 December 2012, the Supreme Court ruled that the one-third-gender rule for elective positions provided for by the Constitution would be implemented progressively up to 2015 and not applied in the March 4 General Election

Judges
The Ruling read by Justice Ojwang’ was made by:
 Chief Justice Willy Mutunga 
 Justice Jackton Ojwang’
 Justice Philip Tunoi
 Justice Smokin Wanjala 
 Justice Njoki Ndung’u

Dissent
Chief Justice Mutunga dissented, saying the ruling flew in the face of the struggle by Kenyan women for gender equality.

References

External links
  Supreme Court Website

Law of Kenya